Falperra Church or the Church of Santa Maria Madalena is a Baroque church located in the (serra da Falperra) Falperra mountains, outside of Braga, Portugal.

About 
The church was built in the early 18th century, by order of the Archbishop D. Rodrigo de Moura Teles. It was a project by the leading Portuguese sculptor and architect André Soares.

The granite retable-like frontage is exuberantly decorated. Particularly striking is the throne with Saint Mary Magdalene, flanked by two small towers bearing the busts of Saint Martha and Saint Lazarus.

References

External links 

Roman Catholic churches in Braga
Baroque church buildings in Portugal
National monuments in Braga District